The 1976 Wightman Cup was the 48th edition of the annual women's team tennis competition between the United States and Great Britain. It was held at the Crystal Palace National Sports Centre in London in England in the United Kingdom.

References

1976
1976 in tennis
1976 in women's tennis
1976 in American tennis
1976 in English women's sport
1976 sports events in London
1976 in English tennis